Yersinia canariae is a Gram-negative species of Yersinia that was isolated from a human displaying symptoms of yersiniosis. Biochemically, it is similar to Yersinia enterocolitica but whole-genome sequencing data determined it is a distinct species.

References

External links
LPSN: Species Yersinia canariae
Type strain of Yersinia canariae at BacDive -  the Bacterial Diversity Metadatabase

canariae
Bacteria described in 2020